The 1934 Delaware State Hornets football team represented the State College for Colored Students—now known as Delaware State University—in the 1934 college football season. In their first season in the Middle Atlantic Athletic Association, Delaware State went undefeated, posting an 8–0 record to win the conference title. They only allowed two points to be scored against them all season and did not allow any touchdowns. Their coach was Edward Jackson.

Schedule

Notes

References

Delaware State
Delaware State Hornets football seasons
College football undefeated seasons
Delaware State Hornets football